The Balls in the Great Meat Grinder Collection is an anthology by Oxbow, released in 1992 through Pathological Records. It collects the band's first two LPs, Fuckfest and King of the Jews, on a single CD.

Track listing

Personnel 
Musicians
Dan Adams – bass guitar
Greg Davis – drums, percussion
Tom Dobrov – drums, percussion
Eugene S. Robinson – vocals
Niko Wenner – guitars, piano, bass guitar, production, arrangements
Recording
Bart Thurber – recording

References 

1992 compilation albums
Oxbow (band) albums